BXY may refer to:

 BXY, the IATA code for Baikonur Krayniy Airport, Kazakhstan
 BXY, the National Rail station code for Bexley railway station, London, England